Kurt Symanzik (November 23, 1923 – October 25, 1983) was a German physicist working in quantum field theory.

Life
Symanzik was born in Lyck (Ełk), East Prussia, and spent his childhood in Königsberg. He started studying physics in 1946 at Universität München but after a short time moved to Werner Heisenberg at Göttingen. There also the fruitful collaboration with Wolfhart Zimmermann and Harry Lehmann started. In 1954 he earned his PhD for his thesis The Schwinger functional in quantum field theory.

After teaching at Princeton and CERN he gained a full professorship at the New York Courant Institute, which he left 1968 for the Hamburg DESY. He died in Hamburg.

Work
Symanzik is most well known for LSZ reduction formula and the Callan–Symanzik equation.

His early work in non-perturbative quantum field theory together in a circle with other researches nicknamed "Feldverein" (Field Club) led to now classic results. He also contributed to the Euclidean quantum field theory ansatz.

Since 1970 his interests shifted to lattice gauge theory. In 1981 he was awarded the Max Planck medal.

Notes

References 
 

1923 births
1983 deaths
People from Ełk
20th-century German physicists
Quantum physicists
People from East Prussia
University of Göttingen alumni
People associated with CERN
Courant Institute of Mathematical Sciences faculty
Winners of the Max Planck Medal
German expatriates in the United States
Academic staff of the University of Hamburg